This is a list of contestants who have appeared on the British television show Britain & Ireland's Next Top Model. Contestants compete against each other to become the next British and Irish top model. They are judged by model Abigail Clancy (previously Lisa Butcher, Lisa Snowdon, and Elle Macpherson) and her panel of judges to win a modeling contract with Models 1, a cover and/or spread in a magazine, and a cosmetics campaign. The series first aired in 2005 and as of 2017, there have been twelve
"cycles" that have aired. In its twelve years running, twelve models have been crowned Britain's Next Top Model: Lucy Ratcliffe, Lianna Fowler, Lauren McAvoy, Alex Evans, Mecia Simson, Tiffany Pisani, Jade Thompson, Letitia Herod, Lauren Lambert, Chloe Keenan, Olivia Wardell & Ivy Watson.

Contestants

1 Originally from Hungary
2 Originally from Nigeria
3 Originally from Serbia
4 Originally from Russia/Latvia
5 Originally from Lithuania
6 Originally from Jamaica
7 Originally from France
8 Originally from The Congo/Ukraine
9 Originally from St. Lucia

Notes
 Contestant's ages are at the time of the season's filming.

References

Britain and Ireland's Next Top Model contestants

Lists of British people
Lists of models